Raleigh is an unincorporated community in Emmet County, Iowa, United States.

Raleigh got its start in the year 1899 as the result of the construction of the Minneapolis & St. Louis railroad through that territory.

References

Unincorporated communities in Emmet County, Iowa
Unincorporated communities in Iowa